Anthony is a common male given name.

Anthony may also refer to:

Awards

 Anthony Awards, literary awards
 Tony Awards, theatre awards

Locations

United Kingdom
 Antony, Cornwall (usage varies)

United States
 Anthony, Florida
 Anthony, Indiana
 Anthony, Kansas
 Anthony, New Jersey
 Anthony, New Mexico
 Anthony, Texas

People
 Anthony (surname)

Saints and clerics

 St. Anthony the Great, of Egypt, 4th-century founder of Christian monasticism
 St. Anthony the Hermit (Antony of Lerins), 5th-century hermit of Italy and Gaul
 St. Anthony of Kiev, founder of Russian monasticism
 St. Anthony of Padua, considered the greatest miracle worker of the thirteenth century, also known as Anthony of Lisbon
 St. Antoninus of Florence, archbishop of Florence

Monarchs
 Anthony I of Portugal, (known commonly as António, Prior of Crato, 1531–1595), disputed King of Portugal and the Algarves
 Antoine of Navarre (also known as Anthony of Navarre, 1518–1562), King of Navarre and Duke of Bourbon
 Antoine, Duke of Lorraine (1489–1544)
 Anton of Saxony (also known as Anthony of Saxony, 1755–1836)), King of Saxony

Other
 Anthony (film editor) (born 1973), Indian film editor
 Anthony (writer) (born 1984), Chinese author
 Anthony Ler (1967–2002), Singaporean convicted murderer

Fictional characters
 Anthony (comics), Indian comic book character
 Anthony (Encantadia), fictional character in Encantadia

See also
Antoine
Antony (disambiguation)
Anton (disambiguation)
Antonia (disambiguation)
Antonio
Antonius
Saint Anthony (disambiguation)
Tony (disambiguation)